Talal Derki (Arabic: طلال ديركي Ṭālāl Dīrkī) is a Syrian Kurdish director, producer and screenwriter. He worked as an assistant director for feature film productions and was a director for different Arab TV programs & TV films between 2009 and 2012. He worked as a freelance  cameraman for CNN and Thomson Reuters. He was Oscar nominated in 2019 and became a member of the Academy. He is the winner of the German Film Awards, Lola, in 2019. Talal Derki's short films and feature length documentaries received tens of awards at various festivals. Both of his films Return to Homs and Of Fathers and Sons won the Grand Jury Prize at Sundance Film Festival 2014 and 2018.

Filmography 
 2003 - Hello Damascus, goodbye Damascus, short fiction, 16mm (12min)
 2005 - A whole line of trees, short fiction, 35 mm (8min)
 2010 - Hero of All Seas, documentary (28min)
 2013 - Return to Homs, documentary (90min)
 2017 - Of Fathers and Sons, documentary (1h 39min)
 2018 - People of the Wasteland, short experimental, producer (21min)
 2022 - A Song for Summer and Winter, feature documentary in progress

Awards & Nominations `Return To Homs´

References

External links
 Talal Derki at the Internet Movie Database

Syrian film directors
1977 births
Living people
Syrian Kurdish people